The 29th Lambda Literary Awards were held on June 12, 2017, to honour works of LGBT literature published in 2016. The list of nominees was released on March 14.

Special awards

Nominees and winners

References

29th
29th Lambda Literary Awards
2017 awards
2017 in LGBT history
June 2017 events in the United States
Lambda
Lambda